Jamal Tyrone Robinson (born December 27, 1973) is an American retired basketball small forward who played one season in the National Basketball Association (NBA) as a member of the Miami Heat during the 2000–01 season. Born in Queens, New York, he attended the University of Virginia where he played for their basketball team. He attended Monsignor McClancy Memorial High School, where he graduated from in 1993. Robinson is the first Monsignor McClancy Memorial High School alumni to play in the NBA. Robinson is now an assistant coach at Old Dominion University.

Career statistics

NBA

Source

Regular season

|-
| style="text-align:left;"|
| style="text-align:left;"|Miami
| 6 || 0 || 12.0 || .136 || .000 || – || 1.8 || .3 || .3 || 1.0 || 1.0

References

External links

1973 births
Living people
American men's basketball players
Basketball players from New York City
Miami Heat players
Roanoke Dazzle players
Scafati Basket players
Small forwards
Sportspeople from Queens, New York
Undrafted National Basketball Association players
Virginia Cavaliers men's basketball players
Al Riyadi Club Beirut basketball players